John Mather (19 November 1821 – 4 August 1870) was an Australian cricketer. He played one first-class cricket match for Victoria in 1856.

See also
 List of Victoria first-class cricketers

References

1821 births
1870 deaths
Australian cricketers
Victoria cricketers
Cricketers from Liverpool
19th-century sportsmen
Melbourne Cricket Club cricketers